Fyne is a free and open-source cross-platform widget toolkit for creating graphical user interfaces (GUIs) across desktop and mobile platforms. Fyne uses OpenGL to provide cross-platform graphics. It is inspired by the principles of Material Design to create applications that look and behave consistently across all platforms. It is licensed under the terms of the 3-clause BSD License, supporting the creation of free and proprietary applications. In December 2019 Fyne became the most popular GUI toolkit for Go, by GitHub star count and in early February 2020 it was trending as #1 project in GitHub trending ranks.

Development
Fyne is currently developed by a team of volunteers and is supported by around 40 contributors. Members of this group also work on the FyneDesk project to create a new Linux desktop environment.

The Fyne toolkit is written primarily in Go. The team focuses on clean APIs and follows the principles of Clean Code to sustain maintainability of the project. All Fyne projects are continuously tested to check correctness, stability as well as formatting and documentation.

Example
The code required for a simple "Hello World" application is minimal, as follows:
package main

import (
	"fyne.io/fyne/v2/app"
	"fyne.io/fyne/v2/container"
	"fyne.io/fyne/v2/widget"
)

func main() {
    a := app.New()
    w := a.NewWindow("Hello")

    hello := widget.NewLabel("Hello Fyne!")
    w.SetContent(container.NewVBox(
        hello,
        widget.NewButton("Hi!", func() {
            hello.SetText("Welcome :)")
        }),
    ))

    w.ShowAndRun()
}

To build this application you will need the Go language and a C compiler installed, as well as a graphics driver that supports OpenGL.
It can be built and run using the command:
$ go run main.go

Design
Design of the Fyne API and user interface components follows a careful process to ensure the simplicity. The Fyne toolkit is built in various layers, with each in separate packages. Notable layers include:

API
API, or Application programming interface, is an interface or protocol that allows for communication across different parts of the software. Fyne has a self-documenting API that is also extensible resulting in the ability for each developer to create custom tools unique to their project that will mesh with Fyne itself.

Vector graphics
The use of vector graphics to paint the UI provides a method of adapting to different device and display sizes without losing image fidelity. This allows the programmer to only need to create the UI once and it will look as expected on any device.

Hierarchy

Canvas
Canvas contains all of the contents of a window ranging from the full screen to a group of CanvasObjects.

CanvasObject
CanvasObjects are what actually get rendered on screen such as Text, Rectangle, Line. The objects store size, position and color information for the rendering process.

Container
Containers are groups of CanvasObjects, each container can specify a layout which will contain the sizing and position of its child components. Layouts help the developer arrange components in a manner that response to the container or window size, with several layout types provided including Border, Center, and Grid.

Widget
All of the components of a window in a CanvasObject are widgets that contain standard user interface elements. Fyne widgets include but are not limited to UI basics such as: Button, Check, Form, Hyperlink, Label, 
Radio, Select and Toolbar as well as container widgets like AppTabs and Split. Since 1.4 there are additional collection widgets that provide high-performance presentation of large data in a List, Table or Tree view. All the built-in UI widgets ensure that standard aspects of GUI interactivity act in a predictable and expected way across applications. This helps improve quality of programs while assisting the programmer by removing the need for them to create these tools themself.

Packages
All components of Fyne are split into packages and then connected via the API to create a final GUI application. In addition to the canvas, layout, and widget packages, notable packages include:
 App package which is the main entry point for the app which manages understanding the type of device the application is running on and ensures the code will run as expected on that device.
 Test package enabling test-driven development to validate the GUI itself functions as expected.

Use
The largest project currently using the Fyne toolkit is the FyneDesk project, a complete desktop environment for Linux.

There are many other applications being built using the toolkit, those that are open source can be found in an application listing website managed by the project.

Many businesses are using the Fyne toolkit to quickly add a graphical user interface to command line tools which they have already built using Go.

Releases

 2.1 - RichText, DocTabs and document storage
 Added DocTabs, RichText and CheckGroup widgets
 New Lifecycle and Document Storage APIs
 Include http and https in standard repositories
 Add FyneApp.toml metadata file to ease build commands
 Add keyboard support for menus, pop-ups and buttons
 2.0 - Data binding, storage repositories and animation
Added data binding for keeping widgets in sync with data sources
Added storage repository API for filestore abstraction, add file and in-memory implementations
Added an animation API and use it for various UI animations
Updated theme API and visuals with re-design for Entry, Select and Form components
Add scrolling and tab support to Entry
Removed many deprecated APIs and types and moved coordinate system from int to float32
 1.4 - Collections widgets and theme refresh
Added Card, FileItem, List, Separator, Table and Tree Widgets
ColorPicker dialog
User selection of primary colour
Add input validation
 1.3 - File Dialogs
File open and save dialogs
Added notifications support
Added Accordion, TextGrid and SplitContainer widgets
Text wrap support
URI type and handlers for cross-platform data access
 1.2 - Mobile Support
Addition of Mobile support (iOS and Android)
Addition of support for Raspberry Pi devices (and other OpenGL ES devices)
BaseWidget introduced to simplify creation of custom widgets
 1.1 - Feature Release
MenuBar, PopUpMenu, Select widgets added
Gradient primitive added and shadows introduced
Added support for text selection
Support for disabling widgets
Tab / Shift-Tab introduced to rotate focused elements
 1.0 - First Major Release
Introduced canvas API for drawing primitives
Introduced widget API including Box, Button, Check, Entry, Form, Group, Hyperlink, Icon, Label, ProgressBar, Radio, Scroller, TabContainer and Toolbar
Light and dark themes for user interface
Support for Linux, macOS and Windows operating systems

Criticism
Issue 299 of Golang Weekly noted the new mobile support from the Fyne project but suggested the design aesthetic was less Material Design and more "generally Linux-y".

References

Bibliography

External links
 
 Fyne tour
 Developer guides
 GoDoc documentation

Application programming interfaces
Widget toolkits